"For You" is a song by Kenny Lattimore, issued as the third and final single from his eponymous debut album. The song is his only hit to date on the Billboard Hot 100, peaking at #33 in 1997.

Music video

The official music video for the song was directed by Okuwah Garrett.

Charts

Weekly charts

Year-end charts

References

External links
 

1996 songs
1997 singles
Columbia Records singles
Kenny Lattimore songs
Contemporary R&B ballads
1990s ballads